Marcel Schelbert (born 26 February 1976) is a retired Swiss athlete who specialized in the 400 metres hurdles.

His personal best time of 48.13 seconds, achieved when he won the bronze medal at the 1999 World Championships, is also a Swiss record. He also won a bronze medal at the 1999 Summer Universiade. For these feats he was given the Swiss Sportsman of the Year Award the same year.

Schelbert retired in 2003, and now works in a bank.

Achievements

References

1976 births
Living people
Swiss male hurdlers
Athletes (track and field) at the 1996 Summer Olympics
Olympic athletes of Switzerland
World Athletics Championships medalists
Universiade medalists in athletics (track and field)
Universiade bronze medalists for Switzerland
Medalists at the 1999 Summer Universiade